Mobile Bay is a natural bay off the island of Newfoundland in the province of Newfoundland and Labrador, Canada. It is on the eastern shore of the Avalon Peninsula.

References

Bays of Newfoundland and Labrador